Dudi Sela was the defending champion, but decided not to participate.

James Ward won the title. He defeated Robby Ginepri 7–5, 6–4 in the final.

Seeds

  Lu Yen-hsun (second round)
  Bobby Reynolds (semifinals, withdrew to left oblique strain)
  Grega Žemlja (quarterfinals)
  Yuichi Sugita (first round)
  James Ward (champion)
  Vasek Pospisil (semifinals)
  Fritz Wolmarans (second round)
  Greg Jones (second round)

Draw

Finals

Top half

Bottom half

References
 Main Draw
 Qualifying Draw

Odlum Brown Vancouver Open
Vancouver Open